Anania griseofascialis is a moth in the family Crambidae. It was described by Koen V. N. Maes in 2003. It is found in Tanzania.

References

Moths described in 2003
Pyraustinae
Moths of Africa